Westcombe, Somerset may refer to two places in England:
 Westcombe, Batcombe, Somerset, a hamlet in Batcombe parish near Shepton Mallet
 Westcombe, Somerton, Somerset, a hamlet near Somerton